TER Bourgogne-Franche-Comté is the regional rail network serving the region of Bourgogne-Franche-Comté, eastern France. It is operated by the French national railway company SNCF. It was formed in 2017 from the previous TER networks TER Bourgogne and TER Franche-Comté, after the respective regions were merged.

Network

The rail and bus network as of April 2022:

Rail

Bus

 Autun – Avallon
 Autun – Chagny
 Châtillon-sur-Seine – Montbard
 Dole – Lons-le-Saunier
 Étang-sur-Arroux – Autun
 Gray – Culmont-Chalindrey
 Mouchard – Salins-les-Bains
 Vesoul – Culmont-Chalindrey
 Vesoul – Gray
 Vesoul – Luxeuil-les-Bains

See also

Réseau Ferré de France
List of SNCF stations in Bourgogne-Franche-Comté

References

External links
TER Bourgogne-Franche-Comté

 
TER